The Algeria Quran is a Quranic manuscript (mus'haf) written in Algeria with the Kufic script, written according to the Warsh recitation in 1977 by .

To date, the print copy has seen three editions, the first published by the SNED, (formerly Hachette Algeria), in 1979. The Second edition (1984) was published by ENAG  and the third by the EPA  in 2010.

See also 

 Islam in Algeria
 Thaalibia Quran
 Ten recitations
 Warsh recitation

References 

Islam in Algeria
Quranic manuscripts
Warsh recitation